The table below shows the 1988 WTA Tier I Series schedule.

Singles

See also 
 WTA Tier I events

See also 
 1988 ATP Tour
 1988 WTA Tour

External links
 Official WTA Tour website